Ueland is a surname. Notable people with the surname include:

Arnulf Ueland (1920-2004), American businessman and politician
Brenda Ueland (1891–1985), American journalist and non-fiction writer
Clara Ueland (1860-1927), American community activist
Eric Ueland (born 1965), American political advisor
Ivar Ueland (born 1943), Norwegian politician
Jonas Ueland Kolstad (born 1976), Norwegian footballer
Ole Gabriel Ueland (1799-1870), Norwegian politician
Ole Gabriel Ueland (1931–2009), Norwegian politician
Osmund Ueland (born 1947), Norwegian civil servant